Kalu Idika Kalu (born October 14, 1939) is a Nigerian politician. He served as Finance Minister of Nigeria, Minister of National planning and Transportation Minister and also twice served as the minister of finance. He was a presidential aspirant in the 2003 Nigeria general elections under the platform of The New Nigeria Peoples Party (NNPP).

Early life
Kalu Idika Kalu was born in Ebem Ohafia, Abia state, southeastern Nigeria. He is of the Ibo people which is one of the largest tribes in Nigeria.

He studied at Kings College Lagos from 1954 to 1960 where he obtained a Bachelor of Science in Economics in 1964.  Kalu also obtained a Masters of Arts in Economics in 1965, as well as a Doctorate Degree in Economic Development and Public Finance in 1972 from the University of Wisconsin. He was a Stimson Fellow while attending Yale University.

Career
He was a founding member of the Justice party, but ran for President on the platform of New Nigeria Peoples Party (NNPP) during the 2003 general elections.

He participated in research work on developing countries and lectured at the university level. While at the World Bank East Asia and Pacific Programs Department, Kalu contributed significantly to micro- and macro- economic work on the economies of Japan, Korea, Taiwan and Hong Kong.

He served in various official positions in Nigeria and outside of Nigeria including;
 Commissioner for Finance & Planning in Imo State
 Minister of Finance
 Minister for National Planning
 Minister of Transport
 Chairman, ECOWAS Council of Ministers
 Chairman, development committee of the World Bank

He is a member of the All Progressives Congress (APC), joining after leaving the People Democratic Party (PDP), as he believes in the emergency of a strong two party system in Nigeria.

Personal life

He married Imo Kalu, with whom he had five children.

References

King's College, Lagos alumni
Living people
1939 births
Finance ministers of Nigeria
All Progressives Congress politicians
Peoples Democratic Party (Nigeria) politicians